The Scorpene deal scam was an Indian bribery scandal, in which USD 175 million (Rupees 1,100 crores) were alleged to have been paid to government decision makers by Thales. Defence minister Pranab Mukherjee had approved a deal to build s worth US$3 billion (Rupees 19,000 crores) with Thales, France in October 2005. The investigating agency, Central Bureau of Investigation (CBI), found no evidence of corruption in the deal in 2008. Scorpène-class submarines are now being built in India under a technology transfer agreement that was part of that contract.

Allegations and investigation
The amount of US$175 million was allegedly channeled and paid to middleman billionaire arms dealer Abhishek Verma who is known as the Lord of War and is the prime accused in the Navy War Room spy scandal and many other defense scandals in India.

The investigation moved very slowly. In 2007, Prashant Bhushan of the Centre for Public Interest Litigation filed a petition with the Delhi High Court to investigate whether there had been kickbacks in the  deal. The Delhi High Court took a strong line with the investigating agency CBI, saying "We feel dissatisfied with what you've done so far. If you've tried to shield someone, then we will come down very heavily on you". French submarine manufacturer Thales refuted the charges, with its country director in India, Francois Dupont, saying, "The e-mails are forgeries and we have sued the news magazine for this."  Arms dealer Abhishek Verma sued former Deputy Prime Minister of India L.K.Advani and Outlook magazine for criminal defamation in 2006 for maligning his name and launching attacks merely on account of political vendetta. In 2016, Abhishek Verma and L.K.Advani resolved their differences amicably and Verma withdrew his defamation case against Advani from Punjab and Haryana High Court.

Result
In 2008, the CBI told the Delhi High Court that after investigations, it had found no evidence of payment of kickbacks in the US$6 billion deal. However the case dragged on for eight years in Delhi High Court. On 13 January 2016 the Chief Justice of Delhi High Court dismissed the PIL (Public Interest Litigation) filed by Prashant Bhushan in 2007, thereby exonerating Abhishek Verma.

References

Political corruption in India
Manmohan Singh administration
Corruption in defence procurement in India
Weapons trade